Chris Glover (born September 4, 1961) is a Canadian politician, who was elected to the Legislative Assembly of Ontario in the 2018 provincial election. He represents the electoral district of Spadina—Fort York as a member of the Ontario New Democratic Party.

Prior to his election to the legislature, Glover was an adjunct professor in social sciences at York University and twice-elected trustee with the Toronto District School Board for Etobicoke-Centre.

On August 23, 2018, Glover was named Official Opposition Critic for Colleges and Universities.

Electoral record

References

External links

1960s births
Living people
Ontario New Democratic Party MPPs
People from Oshawa
Politicians from Toronto
21st-century Canadian politicians
Toronto District School Board trustees